Skhanda Republic is the debut studio album by South African hip hop artist K.O. The album was released on 7 November 2014 under Cashtime record label.

Track listing

Certifications and sales

References 

2015 debut albums